The Redmi Note 12 is a line of Android-based smartphones as part of the Redmi Note series by Redmi, a sub-brand of Xiaomi Inc.

Redmi Note 12 5G, 12 Pro, 12 Pro+, 12 Discovery were announced on October 27, 2022. And, Redmi Note 12 Pro Speed was announced on December 27, 2022.

Redmi Note 12 5G, 12 Pro, and 12 Pro+ were announced in India on January 5, 2023. The Global Redmi Note 12 compared to the Chinese version has a better camera setup, less memory variations, microSD support and a green color option replacing white.

Design 
Redmi Note 12 and Note 12 5G have a front made of Gorilla Glass 3 while other Redmi Note 12 series smartphones and Poco X5 Pro have a front made of Gorilla Glass 5. The back of the Redmi Note 12, Note 12 5G, and Note 12 Speed/Poco X5 Pro is made of polycarbonate but Redmi Note 12 Pro, Note 12 Pro+, and Note 12 Discovery have the back made of glass. Also, Redmi Note 12 5G, Redmi Note 12 Pro+ and Redmi Note 12 Pro Discovery have curved back panels while Redmi Note 12, Redmi Note 12 Pro and Redmi Note 12 Pro Speed/Poco X5 Pro have flat back panels. The flat frame on all models is made of polycarbonate.

The design of the camera island of most Redmi Note 12 series models and Poco X5 Pro is similar to Redmi Note 11T Pro. The camera island of the Redmi Note 12 is similar to Moto X40.

On the bottom side of the Redmi Note 12 and Note 12 5G there are USB-C ports, a speaker and a microphone. On the top side there are additional microphone, IR blaster and 3.5mm audio jack. On the left side there is dual SIM tray in the Chinese version and a hybrid dual SIM tray in the global version. On the right side there are a volume rocker and a power button with a mounted fingerprint scanner.

In other models, on the bottom side, there are USB-C port, a speaker, a microphone, and a dual SIM tray. On the top side, there are a 3.5mm audio jack, an additional microphone, an IR blaster and a second speaker. On the right side are a volume rocker and a power button with a mounted fingerprint scanner.

References 

Android (operating system) devices
Phablets
Redmi smartphones
Mobile phones with multiple rear cameras
Mobile phones with infrared transmitter
Mobile phones introduced in 2022